Mysterious universe may refer to:

Arthur C. Clarke's Mysterious Universe (1994), a television series by science fiction writer Arthur C. Clarke
The Mysterious Universe (1930), a book about science by astrophysicist James Hopwood Jeans
Mysterious Universe: A Handbook of Astronomical Anomalies (1979), a book about anomalous phenomenon by William R. Corliss
Mysterious Universe (2006-present), a podcast out of Australia covering the paranormal, technology, reality, aliens, and anything mysterious.